Everything Is Rhythm is a 1936 British musical film directed by Alfred J. Goulding and starring Harry Roy, Princess Pearl and Dorothy Boyd. It was shot at Elstree Studios near London. The film's sets were designed by the art director George Provis. It was released in America in 1940 by Astor Pictures.

Plot
A member of a band playing at a luxurious hotel falls in love with a princess staying there.

Cast
 Harry Roy as Harry Wade 
 Princess Pearl as Princess Paula 
 Dorothy Boyd as Grethe von Essen 
 Clarissa Selwynne as Miss Mimms 
 Robert English as Duke 
 Gerald Barry as Count Rudolf 
 Phyllis Thackery as Lucy 
 Bill Currie as George Wade 
 Agnes Brantford as Mrs Wade 
 Syd Crossley as Waiter 
 Arthur Clayton as Manager 
 Ivor Moreton as Joe 
 Dave Kaye as Sam

References

Bibliography
 Low, Rachael. Filmmaking in 1930s Britain. George Allen & Unwin, 1985.
 Wood, Linda. British Films, 1927-1939. British Film Institute, 1986.
 Wright, Adrian. Cheer Up!: British Musical Films 1929-1945. The Boydell Press, 2020.

External links

1936 films
1936 musical films
Films directed by Alfred J. Goulding
British musical films
British black-and-white films
Films shot at Rock Studios
Astor Pictures films
1930s English-language films
1930s British films